Lioma, also known as Nihoma in Lomwe, is an administrative post in Zambezia Province, Mozambique. It is a rural community dominated by agriculture, and a centre of soybean production. Lioma has suffered from numerous military conflicts during its history, and was the site of a battle of World War I.

History

Colonial period, war of independence, and civil war 
In the late 19th century, the area where Lioma was later founded was affected by the Arab slave trade. The region was conquered by the Portuguese Empire in the 1890s, and consequently integrated into the colony of Portuguese Mozambique. Lioma itself was founded as a boma by the Portuguese to secure the area after they had defeated a regional chief, Namarohi, who had offered heavy resistance to the colonial army. Lioma was named after another local chief.

In the course of the East African Campaign of World War I, the boma became the site of a supply depot of the British King's African Rifles, who attempted to encircle and destroy the German Schutztruppe that were waging a guerrilla campaign in Mozambique. In August 1918, the Germans attacked the village to capture its supplies, but the British managed to repel them in the subsequent Battle of Lioma.

In the course of the Mozambican War of Independence (1964–1974), Lioma saw little combat, but was prepared for the installation of a large number of Portuguese settlers. Few Whites actually moved to the area, however, as the Portuguese government had problems providing subsidies to settlers. Following the People's Republic of Mozambique's independence in 1975, the new FRELIMO government nationalised the abandoned settler farms at Lioma and transformed them, alongside the "intervening" land of native peasants, into a Soviet-style state farm. The Agricultural Complex of Lioma (CAPEL), as the state farm was named, planted soybeans and other crops with development aid from Brazil. At the time, Lioma was the centre of soybean production in Mozambique. The farm was abandoned in the 1980s, however, when state agents and civilians fled Lioma due to the Mozambican Civil War. RENAMO operated in the area during this conflict, and kidnapped locals.

Economic growth after the civil war 

After the civil war ended, farmers returned to Lioma and began to cultivate the land on a larger scale than before. An NGO, the National Cooperative Business Association, started to support Lioma's farmers in the early 2000s by reintroducing soybeans and promoting farmer associations. These efforts were "highly successful", as they increased local incomes and attracted further investment by outsiders.

In 2003, Lioma was the site of a scandal when it was revealed that a local teacher had sexually abused several female students. After intense lobbying by the Mozambican Association for Gender and Education and Oxfam, the Ministry of Education passed a landmark decision resulting in the dismissal of the teacher and new regulations that provided better legal protection for students nationwide.

A major change took place in Lioma in 2009 when the Mozambican government awarded  that had belonged to the old state farm to the Portuguese company Quifel. Even though the rights to use this land were owned by 244 local farmers under the 1997 Land Law, Quifel was allowed to appropriate it for its "Hoyo Hoyo" project, and the company even seized an additional . Disputes with the locals quickly ensued, especially because the company barely used the land it had been granted.

In July 2012, the government forced Quifel to begin preparing at least  for production. The 836 farmers who had lived on this land agreed to resettle, but disputes continued about the conditions of resettlement, as the new land given to the native farmers was allegedly unsuitable for farming. In August 2014, Brazilian company AGROMOZ drove over 1,000 farmers from their land in Wakhua, a village under Lioma's jurisdiction, to produce soybeans on their land.

Geography
Lioma is part of Gurué District in Zambezia Province, close to the border of Nampula Province. Located around 600 metres (2,000 ft) above sea level in the highlands of western Mozambique, Lioma lies in a valley formed by a stream. It is surrounded by steep hills, which have traditionally been dominated by dense bush interspersed with trees.

Economy

The area around Lioma is well-suited for agriculture, but like the rest of Zambezia Province, it is also one of the poorest regions of Mozambique. When the Portuguese colonial government wanted to settle Whites in the area, they were supposed to live from tea cultivation. Though many locals still live as subsistence farmers, soybean production has become increasingly important since independence. International companies that have invested in Lioma also produce soybeans.

References

Bibliography 

Populated places in Zambezia Province
Populated places established in the 1890s
1890s establishments in the Portuguese Empire